Summerhayes is an English surname. Notable people with the surname include:

David Summerhayes (active 196568), Welsh footballer
Edwin Summerhayes (1868–1944), Australian architect
Geoffrey Edwin Summerhayes (born 1928), Australian architect
 Katie Summerhayes (born 1995), British freestyle skier, sister of Molly
Martha Summerhayes (18441926), American memoirist
Molly Summerhayes (born 1997), British freestyle skier, sister of Katie
V. S. Summerhayes (18971974), English botanist
Violet Summerhayes (1878–1974), Canadian tennis player

See also
Summerhayesia, a genus of flowering plants

English-language surnames